is a Japanese actress, singer, and model. She also reprised her role in two more occasions, first in the Super Sentai Crossover Film Timeranger Vs GogoFive and then in Episode 23 of the 35th Super Sentai Series Kaizoku Sentai Gokaiger

Filmography
 Kyuukyuu Sentai GoGoFive (1999) Matsuri Tatsumi/GoPink
 Kyuukyuu Sentai GoGoFive: Sudden Shock! A New Warrior (1999) Matsuri Tatsumi/GoPink
 Kyuukyuu Sentai GoGoFive Super Video: The Rescue Spirit Five Doctrines (1999) Matsuri Tatsumi/GoPink
 Kyuukyuu Sentai GoGoFive vs. Gingaman (2000) Matsuri Tatsumi/GoPink
 Mirai Sentai Timeranger vs. GoGoFive (2001) Matsuri Tatsumi/GoPink
 To Sing of Love (2002)
 Ju-on: The Grudge (2003) Mariko
 Bayside Shakedown 2 (2003)
 Chateau de Roses (2005) Rosemary
 Samurai Sentai Shinkenger (2009) (Episode 12) Kana (guest star)
 Kaizoku Sentai Gokaiger (2011) (Episode 23) Matsuri Tatsumi/GoPink

References

External links
 Official blog 

Actresses from Kanagawa Prefecture
Japanese film actresses
Japanese television actresses
1980 births
Living people
20th-century Japanese actresses
21st-century Japanese actresses